Nicolas Sestaret (born 26 July 1982) is a former professional Rugby Union player. Sestaret played both at centre and on the wing. He finished his playing career for Exeter Chiefs in the Aviva Premiership.

In 2014 he was appointed Head of Rugby at Taunton School.

2013 - 14 season 

While playing for the Exeter Chiefs, Sestaret made a career highlight with the Exeter Chiefs winning the Aviva Premiership. "Obviously it is very hard to get into the Heineken Cup in the Premiership because it is so competitive so to have that from the LV= Cup is a bonus for sure," said Sestaret of the competition. Before being appointed Head of Rugby at Taunton School, he coached for Sidmouth 1st XV and worked for HSBC Premier in Exeter.

Personal life 

Nicolas has a degree in Marketing and Management, is a Level 2 coach and is qualified in Strength and Conditioning, specializing in speed development.

References

1982 births
Exeter Chiefs players
Living people
Plymouth Albion R.F.C. players
People from Sarlat-la-Canéda
French expatriate rugby union players
Expatriate rugby union players in England
French expatriate sportspeople in England
Sportspeople from Dordogne
Rugby union wings